Rusudan Sikharulidze is a former artistic gymnast from Georgia, representing the Soviet Union in international competition. She won the bronze medal on floor exercise at the 1974 World Championships.

References

Year of birth missing (living people)
Living people
Soviet female artistic gymnasts
Medalists at the World Artistic Gymnastics Championships